CRPC or CrPC may refer to:

 Castration-resistant prostate cancer
 Code of Criminal Procedure (India), or Criminal Procedure Code (CrPC)
 Consumer Rights Commission of Pakistan
 Covenant Reformed Presbyterian Church (denomination)
 Credit Reporting Privacy Code (New Zealand)